Erinnyis crameri, or Cramer's sphinx, is a small member of the family Sphingidae. The species was first described by William Schaus in 1898.

Distribution 
It lives from northern South America, through Central America, and into the lower regions of the United States (Texas and Florida).

Description

References

External links
Cramer's sphinx Moths of America

Erinnyis
Moths described in 1898